James Ferguson Hill (November 5, 1871 – October 15, 1936) was a farmer and politician in Ontario, Canada. He represented Hastings East in the Legislative Assembly of Ontario from 1923 to 1936 as a Conservative.

The son of Matthew Hill and Elizabeth Pegan, he was born in Shannonville and was educated in Deseronto and Belleville. In 1896, Hill married Clara May Leslie. He was a member of the Orange lodge.

Hill died in office at the age of 64.

References

External links

1871 births
1950 deaths
Progressive Conservative Party of Ontario MPPs